Subhash Ramchandrarao Dhote is an Indian politician from Maharashtra and a member of the Indian National Congress in 2009 and 2019. He was elected as a member of the Maharashtra Legislative Assembly from Rajura.

Early life and political career 
Subhash Dhote was elected a member of the Maharashtra Legislative Assembly in 2009 and the Indian National Congress. In 2019 he was elected as a member of the Maharashtra Legislative Assembly from Rajura (Assembly constituency), Government of Maharashtra in MVA.

References

External links 

Living people
Year of birth missing (living people)
Indian politicians
Indian National Congress politicians
Bharatiya Janata Party politicians from Maharashtra